St Nicholas Church is a parish church in the village of Linton, Kent, England. It is a Grade II* listed building.

Building 
St Nicholas Church is located adjacent to the A229 on Linton Hill.

The building is Grade II* listed, built of ragstone, with plain tile roof.

Some of the monuments in the church were sculpted by EH Baily, who was also sculpted the figure of Lord Nelson in Trafalgar Square.

History 
The church was originally a Norman Structure.

The church was most significantly reconstructed in the 1560s.

The church was last reconstructed in 1860, under architect R C Hussey.

Gallery

See also 
 Linton, Kent

References 

Grade II* listed churches in Kent
Grade II* listed buildings in Kent